The Access to Justice Act 1999 is an Act of the Parliament of the United Kingdom. It replaced the legal aid system in England and Wales. It created the Legal Services Commission, replacing the Legal Aid Board, and two new schemes: Community Legal Service to fund civil and family cases, and the Criminal Defence Service for criminal cases. The Act put a cap on the amount spent on civil legal aid. The use of conditional fee agreements, commonly known as  "no-win no-fee", was extended to most civil court cases.

Rights of appeal
Section 54 of the Act both creates and limits rights of appeal. One effect of this, as set out in the UK Supreme Court Practice Direction 1 is "The most important general restriction on rights of appeal is section 54(4) of the Access to Justice Act 1999. The effect of this provision is that the Supreme Court may not entertain any appeal against an order of the Court of Appeal refusing permission for an appeal to the Court of Appeal from a lower court." This accords with Section 40(6) of the Constitutional Reform Act 2005.

References

United Kingdom Acts of Parliament 1999
Legal aid
Acts of the Parliament of the United Kingdom concerning legal services